Christina Lekka (born c. 1972) is a Greek model and beauty queen who became the first and only woman from her country to win the Miss International pageant.

B Miss Hellas
She won the "Ellinida" 1994 title at the Miss Star Hellas pageant. Her Miss International victory came a few months later, when the pageant was held in Ise, Japan.

References

Greek female models
Miss International 1994 delegates
Miss International winners
1970s births
Living people
Greek beauty pageant winners